Traveller Wedding is a 2009 novel by Irish filmmaker Graham Jones.
The story is narrated by a nomadic woman called Christine who is furious at the release of a violent videogame about a traveller wedding and determined to tell the story of her people more authentically.

References

External links
Graham Jones Official Website

2009 Irish novels
Fictional representations of Romani people
Works about Irish Travellers